As Seen from Above is an album by the American band Dianogah, released in 1997.

Critical reception
The Chicago Reader thought that the "trio’s surefooted maneuvers through intricate arrangements lead it down the path taken by guitar bands like the Minutemen, Slovenly, Slint, and Silkworm ... Dianogah’s revisitations aren’t half bad–but neither are they half as good as the originals."

AllMusic wrote that "Jason Harvey and Jay Ryan's dexterous bass work interweaves perfectly with Kip McCabe's precision drumming almost as if the three instruments were one."

Track listing
"Plankton and Krill" – 3:02
"What Is Your Landmass?" – 2:54
"Seeing Stars" – 3:47
"Broken Magnet Halves" – 3:49
"Colby" – 3:39
"Between the Ship and the Land" – 5:29
"Lone Tree Point" – 3:02
"Spiral Bound" – 4:16
"Shogun" – 6:29

References

1997 albums
Dianogah albums
albums produced by Steve Albini